So High is a extended play by British R&B singer Jay Sean. The album was released on 17 October 2012 and the Japan edition on 26 December 2012, by Cash Money Records. The album features guest appearances from Pitbull, Nicki Minaj and Birdman, Lil Wayne.

Track listing

Release history

References

2012 EPs
Jay Sean albums
Cash Money Records EPs